Yefremov or Efremov and Yefremova or Efremova (feminine) is a common Russian surname. It is derived from the male given name Yefrem and literally means Yefrem's. Yefrem is the Russian form of the Hebrew name Ephraim, first used by the Israelite patriarch of that name. In Hebrew, the name means "fruitful, fertile and productive".
The following individuals refer to Yefremov.

 Aleksandr Yefremov:
 Aleksandr Illarionovich Yefremov (1904–1951), Soviet politician, head of Moscow from 1938 to 1939
 Alexander P. Yefremov (born 1945), Russian physicist
 Andriy Yefremov (born 1993), Ukrainian footballer
 Dmitry Yefremov:
 Dmitry Yefremov (born 1974), Russian football player and coach
 Dmitry Yefremov (born 1991), Russian football player
 Dmitry Yefremov (born 1995), Russian football player
 Iliyan Efremov (born 1970), Bulgarian pole vaulter
 Ivan Yefremov (1907–1972), Soviet science fiction writer and paleontologist
 Mikhail Yefremov:
 Mikhail Grigoryevich Yefremov (1897–1942), Soviet military commander
 Mikhail Olegovich Yefremov (born 1963), Soviet and Russian actor, son of Oleg Yefremov
 Mikhail Timofeyevich Yefremov (1911–2000), Soviet politician and diplomat
 Oleg Yefremov (1927–2000), Soviet and Russian actor
 Oleksandr Yefremov:
 Oleksandr Yefremov (born 1954), Ukrainian politician
 Oleksandr Yefremov (functionary) (born 1948), Ukrainian football functionary
 Pyotr Yefremov (1830-1908), Russian literary historian and publisher
 Serhiy Yefremov (1876–1939), Ukrainian literary journalist and political activist
 Yevgeni Yefremov:
 Yevgeni Borisovich Yefremov (born 1970), retired Russian footballer
 Yevgeni Gennadyevich Yefremov (born 1979), Russian footballer
 Yevhen Yefremov (born 1994), Ukrainian footballer
 Vasily Yefremov (1915–1990), Soviet ace, double Hero of the Soviet Union

as well as:
 Antonina Yefremova (born 1981), Ukrainian sprinter
 Lilia Vaygina-Efremova (born 1975), Ukrainian biathlete
 Nelli Yefremova (1962–2019), Soviet sprint canoer

Russian-language surnames
Patronymic surnames
Surnames from given names